Chandalar Lake Airport  is a state-owned public-use airport located at Chandalar Lake in Alaska. This airport is included in the National Plan of Integrated Airport Systems for 2011–2015, which categorized it as a general aviation airport.

Facilities and aircraft 
Chandalar Lake Airport covers an area of 211 acres (85 ha) at an elevation of 1,920 feet (585 m) above mean sea level. It has one runway designated 4/22 with a gravel surface measuring 3,000 by 60 feet (914 x 18 m). For the 12-month period ending December 31, 2005, the airport had 300 aircraft operations, an average of 25 per month: 67% general aviation and 33% air taxi.

References

External links
 FAA Alaska airport diagram (GIF)
 Topographic map from USGS The National Map

Airports in the Arctic
Airports in the Yukon–Koyukuk Census Area, Alaska